Recchia is a genus of beetles in the family Cerambycidae, containing the following species:

 Recchia abauna Martins & Galileo, 1998
 Recchia acutipennis Gahan, 1889
 Recchia albicans (Guérin-Méneville, 1831)
 Recchia boliviana Martins & Galileo, 1998
 Recchia distincta (Lane, 1939)
 Recchia fallaciosa Lane, 1966
 Recchia flaveola Martins & Galileo, 1985
 Recchia fonsecai (Lane, 1939)
 Recchia gemignanii (Lane, 1939)
 Recchia goiana Martins & Galileo, 1985
 Recchia gracilis Martins & Galileo, 1985
 Recchia hirsuta (Bates, 1881)
 Recchia hirticornis (Klug, 1825)
 Recchia lanei Martins & Galileo, 1985
 Recchia ludibriosa Lane, 1966
 Recchia moema Martins & Galileo, 1998
 Recchia parvula (Lane, 1938)
 Recchia piriana Martins & Galileo, 1998
 Recchia planaltina Martins & Galileo, 1998
 Recchia procera Martins & Galileo, 1985
 Recchia ravida Martins & Galileo, 1985
 Recchia veruta Lane, 1966

References

 
Aerenicini